The Battle of Breisach was fought on 18 August — 17 December 1638 as part of Thirty Years' War. It ended after several unsuccessful relief attempts by Imperial forces with the surrender of the Imperial garrison to the French, commanded by Bernard of Saxe-Weimar.

1638 in Europe
Breisach
Breisach
Breisach
17th century in Bavaria
1638 in the Holy Roman Empire
Breisach